Andrew John Richards (born 26 October 1952) is a British pianist, composer, music producer and keyboardist.

Artists he has played with include Frankie Goes to Hollywood, George Michael, Propaganda, Grace Jones, Rush, Annie Lennox, Gary Moore, Pet Shop Boys, Godley & Creme, Dusty Springfield, Petula Clark, Strawbs, OMD, Malcolm McLaren, Nik Kershaw, T'Pau, Maddy Prior and Denny Laine.

Richards has performed and programmed keyboards on 8 UK No. 1 singles, namely: "Relax" (1984) and "Two Tribes" (1984) by Frankie Goes to Hollywood, "Careless Whisper" (1984) by George Michael, "The Lady in Red" (1986) by Chris de Burgh, "It's a Sin" (1987), "Always on My Mind" (1987) and "Heart" (1988) by Pet Shop Boys and "Spaceman" (1996) by Babylon Zoo.

Films Richards has worked on include Bridget Jones's Diary (2001), Touching the Void (2003), The Last King of Scotland (2006), Slumdog Millionaire (2009), which gained 2 Oscars for the music, and 127 Hours (2010).

On Tim Burton's Sweeney Todd: The Demon Barber of Fleet Street (2007) and Frankenweenie (2012), Richards played the classical organ in the chapel of his alma mater, Rugby School.

Early life
Richards began studying piano at the age of 6. At 8, he went to Yarlet School in Staffordshire, England. He also took up the organ and by age 13, whilst at Rugby School (Warwickshire), he dropped piano tuition to focus full-time on the classical organ. He studied with David Gatward in the school chapel which housed a cathedral-sized 4 manual Walker organ.

He left Rugby School at the age of 17 and moved to London where he played with various artists and bands, including the singer Maggie Nicols at her experimental voice and jazz workshops at the Oval House Theatre. At that time, Richards also took jazz piano lessons with jazz pianist Howard Riley.

At 19, he returned to the Midlands and studied piano, organ and composition under Dr. Leon Forrester in Newcastle-under-Lyme. In 1975 he gained an LRAM in Pianoforte Teaching and 1976 an ARCM in Pianoforte Performance, while at the same time working and playing in a number of semi-professional rock and jazz-rock bands in Stoke-on-Trent. After completing his studies with Leon Forrester, Richards taught music at South Cheshire College.

Career

Strawbs

In October 1977, Richards auditioned for the folk-rock band, Strawbs. Pete Solley, the producer and keyboard player in the band Paladin spotted Richards playing in the band 'Rock Workshop' in Stoke-on-Trent and recommended him to Dave Cousins at a time when Strawbs were looking for a full-time keyboardist. A week later, Dave Cousins and the band invited him to join the group.

He toured and recorded with Strawbs, his first gig being at the Hammersmith Odeon in London, but the first album that he made with them in 1978 had its release stalled due to management and record company problems. Heartbreak Hill was recorded at Startling Studios in Ascot, Ringo Starr's home. Heartbreak Hill was finally released in 1995.

In 1979, Tom Allom, Heartbreak Hill's record producer, invited Richards to play for the very first time as a session musician on Michael Chapman's album Life on the Ceiling at Sawmills Studios in Cornwall.

Early sessions
In mid-1980, Strawbs split up and Richards became a musician for hire, working and recording with Maddy Prior (from Steeleye Span) and Denny Laine (from Wings) touring both Europe and Scandinavia. He played on sessions for Junior Campbell (from Marmalade) at Startling Studios and in Manchester at Pluto Studios with Keith Hopwood where he played keyboards and wrote a number of jingles.

Whilst in Manchester, he was part of a band called Sneaky Pierre, featuring the cream of Manchester's session musicians which included some members of Sad Café, and in 1983 was invited by Mike Stone of Clay Records to produce the synth-pop band White Door from Stoke-on-Trent. It was recorded at Pluto Studios by Phil Bush and was mixed in Sarm East Studios by Julian Mendelsohn who was working with Trevor Horn at the time.

Trevor Horn and "Relax"

In the fall of 1983, Richards was playing keyboards for the show Electric Ice, which was being performed at the Victoria Palace Theatre by ice skater Robin Cousins and his troupe of skaters, when he received 2 calls – one from the band Yes and the other from record producer Trevor Horn via a recommendation from audio engineer and mixer Julian Mendelsohn. He auditioned for Yes but immediately began work as Horn's keyboard player in October 1983; the first track they recorded together being Frankie Goes to Hollywood's "Ferry 'Cross the Mersey", written by Gerry Marsden, and the second was "Relax".

Horn had made 3 versions of "Relax" prior to Richards and guitarist Stephen Lipson joining his ZTT Production 'Theam' in late 1983. Horn left the studio late one night asking for Lipson to erase the multitrack (of version 3) due to lack of progress, but came back into the studio some time later to hear Richards playing a variety of modal chords based around the key of E minor with Lipson playing guitar along to the unerased multitrack. The final version of "Relax" was born and it won Best British Single at the 1985 Brit Awards and was at No. 1 in the UK charts for 5 weeks after being banned from BBC Radio, initially by DJ Mike Read, for being "obscene".

In 1984 as a keyboard player, Richards was at number one on the UK Singles Chart for a total of 19 weeks, performing on Frankie Goes to Hollywood's "Relax" and "Two Tribes" and George Michael's "Careless Whisper". This launched his career as both a Fairlight programmer and a top UK session musician. During the following years, apart from playing the keyboards for Frankie Goes to Hollywood, Richards played with bands and artists including Propaganda, Grace Jones, Nik Kershaw, Rush, Gary Moore, Pet Shop Boys, Dusty Springfield, Petula Clark, Seal and Godley & Creme.

Music production
From the mid-1980s and throughout the 1990s, Richards continued with his session work but also branched out into record production, producing for bands and artists including Pet Shop Boys (with "Heart" being at No. 1 in the UK for 3 weeks), T'Pau, Fuzzbox, Prefab Sprout, Malcolm McLaren, Dusty Springfield, Petula Clark, OMD and Berlin.

Out of Eden Studios and film score mixing

In 2000, Richards setup one of London's first bespoke all-digital mixing/recording studios, Out of Eden – a partnership between himself and the directors of the late studio complex Eden Studios in Chiswick, West London. It was a revolutionary audio concept which was the subject of a number of articles on the web, including The Polymath Perspective. It was here that Richards began the transition from being purely music-based into being involved in music for film and beyond.

In 2005, Richards began a partnership with acclaimed film music editor and producer Mike Higham (who had also worked with Trevor Horn) which has endured as Higham-Richards.

Film scores mixed in Out of Eden include Bridget Jones's Diary (2001), Dirty Pretty Things (2002), Mona Lisa Smile (2003), Touching the Void (2003), Shaun of the Dead (2004) and The Last King of Scotland (2006).

Current projects
Richards continues to run his own digital studio, Out of Eden, in West London where he has mixed a number of film scores, including the surround scores for Danny Boyle's Slumdog Millionaire (2009) (which gained 2 Oscars) and 127 Hours (2010), State of Play (2009) and Tim Burton's Frankenweenie (2012) and Sweeney Todd: The Demon Barber of Fleet Street (2007) (nominated for a Grammy).

He worked on his solo project entitled This Time... An Imaginary Soundtrack that was due for release in 2019.

Discography
Source:

1970s

1980s

1990s

2000s

2010s

Filmography

1980s

1990s

2000s

2010s

References

External links
 Official website
 
 

1952 births
Living people
English record producers
English male film score composers
English rock keyboardists
English songwriters
Mixing engineers
Musicians from London
Strawbs members
Associates of the Royal College of Music